Vedhika Kumar is an Indian actress and model who has established a career in the Malayalam, Telugu, Tamil and Kannada films. 

She started her acting career with the Tamil film Madrasi. She made her breakthrough portraying Angamma in Bala's period film Paradesi (2013), winning critical acclaim and awards for her portrayal. A year later she starred in Kaaviya Thalaivan (2014). In 2016, her Kannada film Shivalinga went on to become one of the biggest blockbusters in Kannada industry. In 2019, she appeared in the Tamil film Kanchana 3  which became one of the highest grossing Tamil films of the year. She made her Bollywood debut in 2019, with the film The Body.

Early life
Vedhika was brought up in Mumbai but their family hails from the border areas of Maharashtra–Karnataka states. Her mother tongue is Kannada.

Career
Early in her career, she was involved in modelling assignments and did a notable advert for biscuits alongside prominent actor Suriya. She was subsequently approached by Arjun to essay the lead role in his production Madrasi and Vedhika accepted the role. Her role went largely unnoticed due to the film being based around Arjun's action image, with a critic labelling her performance as "adequate". After the release of Madrasi, Vedhika went on to sign a big budget Hindi language film, Jai Santoshi Maa, a remake of the 1975 film of the same name, but the film failed to subsequently materialize and Vedhika continued acting in South Indian films. She went on to feature in Raghava Lawrence's comedy horror Muni, but her role was minimal once again and the film went to become an average grosser commercially. Her maiden Telugu venture was in Vijayadasami, a remake of the Tamil film Sivakasi, where her performance was described as "okay" and "average" by critics.

Her first release in 2008, the Silambarasan-starrer Kaalai, received negative reviews and became a commercial failure. However, the film became notable for the dance number, "Kutti Pisase" with Vedhika's dancing being critically appreciated. She went on to appear in a second successive film which was panned by critics and which became a financial failure with a role in Sakkarakatti. The long-delayed film featured Shanthnoo Bhagyaraj making his debut in the lead role and A. R. Rahman providing the soundtrack, however Vedhika's role was described as one of the sole positives from the project. Later that year, she starred in a Kannada film, Sangama opposite Ganesh, and the film fetched her good reviews for her performance. In 2009, she appeared as the radio jockey Anjali in A. Venkatesh's Malai Malai with the film consequently going on to become a success commercially. The film had little scope for Vedhika and reviews cited her role as "pure eye candy" whilst claiming she was "apt" for the role. She made a comeback to Telugu films in the same year, with a role in the critically acclaimed Baanam. Her role won her plaudits, whilst her on screen presence with Nara Rohit was praised with a critic citing she gives "good company as the naïve girl" and it is "refreshing to see them together". After the release of Baanam, Kumar went on a sabbatical and did not sign any other films until, despite making an appearance in a notable advert with Karthi for mobile company Airtel. She signed and next featured in the Telugu film Daggaraga Dooranga opposite Sumanth, which opened to average reviews in August 2011.

2013–present: Breakthrough and success
The actress was signed up by director Bala for Paradesi (2013), an adaptation of the 1969 tragic novel Red Tea, set in the 1930s. She had been recommended by actress Sangeetha, signing the film in December 2011 and did not accept to appear in any other project till the release, sporting a significantly de-glamourised appearance and portraying a village character for the first time. The film, which also starred Adharvaa and Dhansika opened to unanimously positive reviews in March 2013 and performed well at the box office. Critics raved about her performance as Angamma, with the critic from The Times of India noting that "after doing roles that only required her to look pretty, Vedhika gets a chance to show off her acting skills" with Indiaglitz.com citing that she "produced a memorable performance". The critic from Rediff.com noted that "Vedhika plays the role of a young village belle to perfection", while Sify.com labelled that she delivered a "spellbinding performance". Her second release in 2013, the Malayalam film Sringaravelan, became one of the industry's biggest commercial successes of the year.

Shen then worked on Vasanthabalan's historical fiction film Kaaviya Thalaivan (2014), which was set in the backdrop of Madras theatre scene of the 1920s, and featured her alongside Siddharth and Prithviraj. Portraying a character inspired by stage artist K. B. Sundarambal, Kumar noted it was a "once-in-a-lifetime opportunity" and signed the film straight after being offered it. She prepared for her role by watching early Tamil films and drama videos, but all the actors were asked to "add their personal touch to their respective characters to make everything look authentic". Moreover, for her part of her role, she also perfected her classical dancing skills and worked with choreographer Raghuram for an extended dance sequence in the film. The film opened in November 2014 to positive reviews, with Kumar's performance being unanimously lauded by film critics. A reviewer from Sify.com noted "it is so good to see Vedhicka in a role where she not only looks beautiful but delivers a brilliant performance as Vadivambal", while Behindwoods.com added it is a "role of substance and the big eyed actress has utilized her opportunity completely".

Filmography

Awards and nominations

References

External links
 
 

Living people
Kannada people
People from Solapur
Actresses in Kannada cinema
Actresses in Tamil cinema
Indian film actresses
Actresses in Telugu cinema
Actresses in Malayalam cinema
Actresses from Maharashtra
21st-century Indian actresses
Year of birth missing (living people)
Actresses in Hindi cinema